Paracercion calamorum, the dusky lilly-squatter, is a species of damselfly in the family Coenagrionidae. It has a range that extends from southern far-eastern Russia to Japan, and to India and Indonesia. The nominate subspecies P. c. calamorum is known from central and eastern China, Korea and Japan. The subspecies P. c. dyeri occurs in southern China, Hong Kong, Taiwan, Indonesia, India, Nepal, and Thailand.

Description and habitat
It is a medium-sized damselfly with brown-capped yellowish green eyes. Its thorax is black on dorsum without any or very fine azure blue antehumeral stripes, which are very broad in Paracercion malayanum. Lateral sides of thorax are greenish blue with a fine black line on the upper part of each lateral suture. In old males, all these marks are obscured by bluish white pruinescence. Its wings are transparent and pterostigma is yellow, framed with heavy black nervures. Its abdomen is azure blue with broad black dorsal marks up to segment 7. Segment 2 has a distinct broad dorsal spot connected narrowly to a fine apical ring. This mark will help to distinguish it from Pseudagrion species. Segment 10 has a narrow mid-dorsal black streak. Female is dull in colors. Its abdomen is similar to the male. But the lateral ground colour is greenish-yellow and segments 8 and 9 are broadly black on dorsum. Segment 10 is bluish-green. Female also get pruinosed when aged.

It breeds in stagnant and weedy ponds, resting flat on floating grasses and lotus leaves. Eggs are inserted well within the up-curled rim of the lotus leaf or any other floating vegetation.

See also 
 List of odonates of India
 List of odonata of Kerala

References

External links 

Coenagrionidae
Insects described in 1916